Semes Kandeh or Semeskandeh or Samaskandeh may refer to:
 Pain Semes Kandeh
 Semes Kandeh-ye Olya